Ten-pin bowling, for the 2019 Island Games, held at Kings Bastion Leisure Centre, Gibraltar in July 2019.

Medal table

Results

Men

Women

Mixed

References 

2019 Island Games
Island Games